Kalani Oceanside Retreat, also known as Kalani Honua or Kalani, is a non-profit retreat center located on the Big Island of Hawai'i. It was established in 1975 and focuses on natural and holistic living, yoga and relaxation, and spiritual retreats. Kalani has historically been staffed by a core group of administrators, managers, and coordinators, plus volunteers from around the world. 

In 2019 Kalani relaunched with a new board of directors, and with largely local staff in lieu of volunteer staffing.

Overview 

Kalani Oceanside Retreat, founded by Richard Koob and Earnest Morgan in 1975, is a non-profit retreat center, occupying a 120-acre compound located in the Puna District of the Big Island of Hawai'i.  Kalani's mission is "to provide a fun, safe, and educational retreat village which encourages ALOHA love for life in each person's own deepest way through participation in abundant nature, culture, and wellness experiences". In keeping with the focus on nature, culture, and wellness, Kalani hosts diverse residential workshops; sponsors community arts and special events programs; provides lodging and meals for guests; oversees volunteer, sabbatical, and visiting artist education programs; and houses a sustainable community of residents in an ecovillage.

History 

In 1975, professional dancers Richard Koob and Earnest Morgan purchased the original 19-acre property, which they called Kalani Honua, translated as "harmony of Heaven on Earth". They based the center on their ideal of building a community to "celebrate art, nature, health, and spirit".

In the early years, Kalani was a small family operation. A conscious effort was made to include Hawaiian natives in the growing community. 

Workshops and classes focused on topics such as Hawaiian culture, yoga, dance, painting, music, and creative writing. Workshop and course offerings increased as Kalani became known as a destination retreat center. Extensive volunteer, sabbatical, and visiting artist education programs were developed, and Kalani grew to be the largest and oldest retreat center in Hawaii.

Over time, the Kalani campus was expanded to its current 120 acres, with purchase of the adjacent 94-acre Kalani Kai ("Heavenly Sea") parcel, and the 6-acre Kalani Mauka ("Heavenly Uplands") parcel, land specifically dedicated to building a sustainable agricultural community.

Programs
Kalani operates as a non-profit, 501(c)(3) charity through Kalani Honua, Inc., with a focus on nature, culture, and wellness.

Workshops offered at Kalani residential retreats focus on art and human development, holistic health, and Hawaiian culture, and include yoga, dance, and bodywork.

Kalani sponsors the Puna Community Arts Program, which consists of daily scheduled public offerings (more than 50 per week, many at no cost to the public, or by donation), such as yoga, meditation, qigong, dance, and alternative healing. The weekly Ecstatic Dance draws a large number of participants from the surrounding community. Special events consist of lectures, performances, symposia, festivals, dances, and other activities open to the general public, including the Puna Music Festival, Puna Culinary Festival, Illuminato, and the Hawaiʻi Yoga Festival.

Kalani oversees a residential volunteer education program, with more than 100 volunteers on site at a time. Volunteers are expected to contribute to the community through work in the kitchen, housekeeping, grounds, maintenance, or administrative office, and are encouraged to participate in daily life in the community, as well as workshops, classes, and Arts Program activities. Sabbatical and Visiting Artist programs are offered to encourage self-development and artistic endeavor, as well as to enrich the community.

The Hawaiʻi Massage School at Kalani offers full-time and part-time bodywork training, as well as an apprenticeship program approved by the Hawaiʻi State Massage Board to satisfy course requirements and prepare for the state certification examination.

The mission of Kalani emphasizes values of community, cultural and lifestyle diversity, and sustainable living. Community members include international visitors, locals, and people of Hawaiian descent, along with "vegetarian, vegan, gay, straight or other, young or old".

As of 2013, the annual economic impact of Kalani was estimated at nearly $10 million. The majority of Kalani's expenditures stay in the state, and contribute to the local economy of the Puna District,  the poorest district in Hawaiʻi. All proceeds from guest stays go into Kalani’s community programming and services. According to Kalani founder Richard Koob "[Kalani buys] as much produce as we can from local farmers, with many farmers growing specifically to supply Kalani’s needs".

Structure and management 

Kalani's facilities include simple guest lodging, a large community dining area (dining lanai), numerous buildings and rooms dedicated to workshops and classes, resident housing and camping areas, and a clothing optional pool and spa area. Grounds include gardens, open space, recreational areas, permaculture plantings, and natural areas.

Kalani's Wellness Department offers land and aquatic bodywork, including traditional Hawaiian LomiLomi, Thai massage, and Watsu.

Kalani serves healthy buffet-style meals in a roofed patio known in Hawaii as a "lanai". The dining lanai is considered to play a central role in the community, described as a gathering place where one "can experience the daily rhythms of assembly and departure reminiscent of ancient village life". A guide to Kalani's cuisine describes the food as "a Pacific fusion of local, Thai, Indian, Italian, and many other cuisines".

For 38 years Richard Koob served as the Director of Kalani. Lester John ("LJ") Bates III was appointed as Kalani’s Executive Director in November 2012, and after a period of transition Richard Koob officially retired in July 2013. Richard continues as a Kalani Board Member and Director Emeritus, assisting with the realization of Kalani's second thirty-year plan. Kalani appointed a new Executive Director, Joel Tan, in April 2016.

Kalani operates with a small paid staff and a large volunteer workforce. Institutional structure comprises a sustainable living educational focus in all departments: Programs, Cultural Heritage, Culinary/Kitchen,  Ho'okipa/Housekeeping, Maintenance, New Construction, Permaculture/Horticulture, Information Management,  Student/Faculty Services, Wellness/Massage, and Administration.

Kalani houses an "ecovillage" of resident "stewards" who live onsite and contribute to the community in a variety of ways.  Resident housing is primarily in clusters of eco-cottages, with an emphasis on sustainable living.

Environment 

Kalani is located on the Red Road (Highway 137 or Kapoho-Kalapana Road), named because it used to be paved with red cinder from the Kapoho eruption of 1960. The road winds along rugged cliffs overlooking the ocean, through tropical rainforest, recent lava flows, and tunnel-like canopies of kamani (Calophyllum inophyllum), milo (Thespesia populnea), and hala (Pandanus tectorius) trees. 

Nearby natural areas include Isaac Hale Beach Park, a protected section of coastline popular for swimming, surfing, and boating; MacKenzie State Recreation Area, a secluded park featuring groves of ironwood trees and lava tubes that open to the ocean; Aʻakepa, a hidden expanse of lava flats and tide pools with tidal channels and small lagoons; and Kehena Beach, a natural black sand beach. The Kapoho Tide Pools (officially named the Wai Opae Tide Pools Marine Life Conservation District), a protected coral reef ecosystem, and Ahalanui Beach Park, a volcanically heated hot pond, were destroyed during the 2018 lower Puna eruption.

Heritage sites 

Three heritage sites at Kalani are registered with the Hawai’i State Department of Land
and Natural Resources:
Heiau Stone Temple site, re-consecrated by native kahuna spiritual leaders; dedicated to Lono and Kanaloa, gods of agricultural and ocean abundance, peace, parties, and prosperity; 
Halau School site, operated until 1900, transitioned from traditional native cultural practices to the inclusion of western missionary influence; 
Ala Kai coastal trail sections, which once served as part of the major land route connecting more than 600 communities of the island kingdom of Hawai‘i between the 15th and 18th centuries.

Awards 
Kalani has received awards on TripAdvisor:
Certificate of Excellence, 2012, 2013, 2014, Tripadvisor
Greenleaders Platinum, 2013, 2014, Tripadvisor

Members of Kalani's community have received awards for various contributions and activities:
Best Overall, First Annual PRIDE parade, July 6, 2013, Hawaii Island Pride
Best Use Of Organic Ingredients, Josef Schneider: Raw Vegan Egg Salad, 2013, Pupu Palooza Award at the Puna Culinary Festival
Commendation for Strong Commitment to Nurturing and Education, 2013. Hawai'i State Legislature Commendation to Kalani Founder Richard Koob for "pursuit of excellence" and "lasting legacy", State of Hawai'i 27th Senate

2018 lava-eruption closure and 2019 relaunch
In May 2018, due to the 2018 lower Puna eruption, Kalani closed its operations, stating "Kalani is currently closed. We are not accepting registrations or volunteer applications at this time. ... Recent earthquake activity on Kilauea’s south flank and lava eruptions in the Leilani Estates Subdivision are affecting air quality." Follow-up announcements in June 2018 stated that all operations had been indefinitely suspended.

In early 2019, Kalani was offered for sale by its owners. Richard Koob's statement on his website announced that:

On July 19, 2019, the organization announced a "rebirth" of Kalani, with a new board of directors. The announcement stated "Kalani intends to relaunch with a new vision, supported by community crowd funding, to begin generating revenue, making necessary improvements and, ultimately, supporting healing and restoration to lower Puna." As of July 23, 2019, Kalani has re-launched, with a new board of directors, and local employment in lieu of volunteer staff, and is gradually restoring its operations.

See also 
Arthur Johnsen—Artist-in-residence 1989–1998
Omega Institute for Holistic Studies

References

External links

Facebook page 
Old site (archived from January 2018)

Ecovillages
Hawaii (island)
Intentional communities in the United States
Meditation
Simple living
Spiritual retreats